Erika Salumäe (born 11 June 1962) is an Estonian track bicycle racer who won the first Olympic gold medal for Estonia after the country regained independence in 1991.

Salumäe was born in Pärnu, Estonia. She trained at VSS Kalev in Tallinn. At the 1983 Summer Universiade she won two gold medals, in the women's sprint and women's 500 m time trial and the silver medal in the women's points race. Salumäe won the gold medal in track cycling at the 1988 Summer Olympics in Seoul, competing for the USSR team and in the 1992 Summer Olympics in Barcelona, competing for Estonia.

At World Championships from 1984 to 1989, she won 2 golds (1987 and 1989), 2 silvers (1984 and 1986) and 1 bronze (1995). From 1982 to 1989, she set 15 world records and was elected the Best Estonian Athlete in 1983, 1984, 1987–1990, 1992, 1995, and 1996.

References

External links

 
 
 
 

1962 births
Living people
Sportspeople from Pärnu
Estonian female cyclists
Olympic cyclists of Estonia
Olympic gold medalists for the Soviet Union
Olympic gold medalists for Estonia
Cyclists at the 1988 Summer Olympics
Cyclists at the 1992 Summer Olympics
Cyclists at the 1996 Summer Olympics
Olympic cyclists of the Soviet Union
Olympic medalists in cycling
UCI Track Cycling World Champions (women)
Medalists at the 1992 Summer Olympics
Medalists at the 1988 Summer Olympics
21st-century Estonian politicians
Universiade medalists in cycling
Estonian track cyclists
Honoured Masters of Sport of the USSR
Universiade gold medalists for the Soviet Union
Universiade silver medalists for the Soviet Union
Medalists at the 1983 Summer Universiade
Members of the Riigikogu, 1999–2003
Members of the Riigikogu, 2007–2011
Women members of the Riigikogu
21st-century Estonian women politicians